Reenat Sandhu (born 7 June 1964) is an Indian diplomat and the ambassador to the Netherlands. She had previously served as the Indian Ambassador to Italy and San Marino.

Personal life
Sandhu holds a Master of Arts degree in Economics from the Delhi School of Economics. She is married to Taranjit Singh Sandhu who is the current Ambassador of India to the  United States. They have two children.

Career
Reenat Sandhu joined the Indian Foreign Service in August 1989. She has served at the Indian missions in Moscow, Kyiv, Washington, D.C., Colombo, New York and Geneva. She has also worked at the Ministry of External Affairs in New Delhi and handled Investment and Trade Promotion, Projects, East Europe and Sri Lanka desks.

She was the Deputy Permanent Representative of India to the World Trade Organization in Geneva from 2011 to 2014. From 2014 to 2017, she was the Minister (Commerce) and later the Deputy Chief of Mission at the Indian Embassy in Washington, D.C.

Sandhu was made the first Additional Secretary of the new Oceania vertical in the MEA, including the former Indo-Pacific and South divisions. Following this she became Secretary (West).

References 

Living people
Indian Foreign Service officers
Indian women ambassadors
1964 births
Ambassadors of India to Italy
Delhi School of Economics alumni